Jack Montoucet (born October 1947) is an American politician serving as the secretary of the Louisiana Department of Wildlife and Fisheries under Democratic Governor John Bel Edwards.

Career 
From 2008 to 2017, Montoucet was a Democratic member of the Louisiana House of Representatives for District 42 in Lafayette and Acadia parishes. A resident of Scott in Lafayette Parish, he was the vice chair of the Acadiana delegation and a member of the Democratic Caucus and the Louisiana Rural Caucus. Montoucet retired as the chief of the Lafayette Fire Department and owns the alligator farm, Jacques Crocs and Farm Pride Processors.

Elections

2011

On October 22, 2011, Montoucet won re-election to District 61 of the Louisiana House of Representatives, defeating Republican Anthony Emmons in the primary. Because Louisiana uses a blanket primary system, a candidate can be declared the overall winner of the seat by garnering 50 percent +1 of the vote in the primary.

2007

In 2007, Montoucet was elected to the Louisiana House of Representatives. He defeated fellow Democrat Isabella delaHoussaye.

References

Sources
This article incorporates text from Ballotpedia, released under the GFDL.

1947 births
Living people
Democratic Party members of the Louisiana House of Representatives
American fire chiefs
People from Lafayette, Louisiana
People from Scott, Louisiana
21st-century American politicians
State cabinet secretaries of Louisiana